Willow Creek Winery is a winery in West Cape May in Cape May County, New Jersey. Formerly a produce farm, the vineyard was first planted in 2005, and opened to the public in 2012. Willow Creek has 40 acres of grapes under cultivation, and produces 6,000 cases of wine per year. The winery has recently purchased Legates Farm Market and is cultivating an additional 68 acres under vine. The winery is named for a large willow tree near the owner's residence, and the Pond Creek, a stream that borders the farm.

Wines and other products
Willow Creek Winery is in the Outer Coastal Plain AVA, and produces wines from Albariño, Cabernet Franc, Cabernet Sauvignon, Chambourcin, Malbec, Malvasia bianca, Merlot, Muscat blanc, Pinot noir, Riesling, Sangiovese, Sauvignon blanc, Seyval blanc, and Syrah grapes. The farm also produces eggs, flowers, fruits, honey, poultry, vegetables, and wormwood.  Willow Creek makes wine from local New Jersey apples and pumpkins, and has a separate brand for non-estate wines, named "Wilde Cock" after the owner and the roosters that live at the farm. The winery has expressed interest in producing absinthe in the future. Willow Creek is the only winery in New Jersey that produces wine from Malvasia bianca, which is a white vinifera grape indigenous to the northwest coast of Italy.

Visitors enjoy educational tastings of the Estate Varietals and curated blended wines that are available only through The Tasting Room at Willow Creek.  Open year-round, the winery has recently added a full grill menu boasting dishes such as bacon-wrapped scallops, 18-hour slow smoked pork, charcuterie and international cheese boards and the like.

Willow Creek is also an award-winning wedding and event venue able to host celebrations from a 10-person anniversary party to a 300+ wedding.

Licensing, associations, and other properties
Willow Creek has a farm winery license from the New Jersey Division of Alcoholic Beverage Control, which allows it to produce up to 50,000 gallons of wine per year, operate up to 15 off-premises sales rooms, and ship up to 12 cases per year to consumers in-state or out-of-state. The winery is a member of the Garden State Wine Growers Association, but not the Outer Coastal Plain Vineyard Association. In 1996, the owner of Willow Creek founded The Southern Mansion, a 24-suite bed and breakfast in the neighboring town of Cape May. Food produced at the farm is served at The Southern Mansion.

Controversy
Willow Creek has had conflicts with municipal, county, and state authorities regarding the hosting of weddings at the winery. The West Cape May borough council has expressed concerns about potential noise and traffic from events, and several local and county officials have said that Willow Creek misrepresented how its facilities would be used. In 2012, the Cape May County Agriculture Development Board and the New Jersey Agriculture Development Committee stated that because the winery is on preserved farmland, it could not hold weddings or other non-agricultural events. Willow Creek maintains that the deed of easement granted when the farm was preserved does not prohibit celebratory events. The winery has since sued the mayor of West Cape May in federal court, stating that she has a conflict of interest in her land use decisions because she is also a marriage officiant. In June 2016, West Cape May decided to settle the lawsuit and agreed to pay Willow Creek Winery $550,000 to prevent a trial. In addition, the borough has had to make payments for violations of the Open Public Records Act due to withholding of requested public information.

See also 
Alcohol laws of New Jersey
Judgment of Princeton
List of wineries, breweries, and distilleries in New Jersey
New Jersey Farm Winery Act
New Jersey wine

References

External links 
Garden State Wine Growers Association

Wineries in New Jersey
Tourist attractions in Cape May County, New Jersey
2012 establishments in New Jersey
West Cape May, New Jersey